The Associação de Futebol do Algarve (Algarve Football Association) is one of the 22 District Football Associations that are affiliated to the Portuguese Football Federation. The AF Algarve administers lower tier football in the district of Faro.

Background
Associação de Futebol do Algarve, commonly referred to as AF Algarve, is the governing body for football in the district of Faro. The Football Association is based in Penha in Faro, close to Piscinas Municipais de Faro (Faro Municipal Swimming Pool) and Complexo Desportivo da Penha (Sports Complex of Penha). The Association's President is António Coelho Matosa.

The organisation was established on 22 January 1922 following an initial meeting on 15 October 1921 at the Ginásio Clube Farense by representatives from a number of Algarve clubs including Sporting Clube Farense, Sport Lisboa e Faro, Boxing Futebol Clube (Portimão), Sporting Clube Olhanense, Lusitano Futebol Clube, Glória Futebol Clube, Portimonense Sporting Clube, Sport Club União, Sport Club "Os Leões Portimonenses" and Esperança Futebol Clube. The two previous attempts to establish a Football Association ended in failure.

Competitions
Algarve clubs compete in the three national levels of the Portuguese football league system in competitions run by the Portuguese League for Professional Football (Primeira Liga and LigaPro) and Portuguese Football Federation (Campeonato de Portugal (league)).

Below the Campeonato de Portugal, the competitions are organised at a district level (known in Portuguese as Distritais) with each District Association organising its competitions according to geographical and other factors. The AF Algarve runs two league competitions with the Division One (1ª divisão) being at the fourth level of the league system and Division Two (2ª divisão) at the fifth level. At one time this second tier was divided into two groups on a geographical basis.

In more general terms the AF Algarve currently organises District Championships for Football and Futsal for men and women for all age groups including Senior, Junior, Youth, Beginners, Infants and Schools.

Notable clubs affiliated to AF Algarve

Primeira Liga (tier 1)
 Portimonense SC
 SC Farense

Campeonato de Portugal (league) (tier 3)
 Esperança de Lagos
 Louletano DC
 Moncarapachense
 SC Olhanense

Distritais (tiers 4 & 5)
 Almancilense
 C.D.R. Quarteirense
 Ferreiras
 Imortal Desportivo Clube
 Lusitano FC
 Operário
 Silves F.C.

2020–21

AF Algarve Division One covering the regional fourth tier of the Portuguese football league system.

Division One (1ª divisão)

 Associação Farense 1910
 C.D.R. Quarteirense
 C.D Odiáxere
 C.F. Esperança Lagos
 C.U. Culatrense
 F.C. Ferreiras
 F.C. Os 11 Esperanças
 G.D. Lagoa
 Guia F.C.
 Imortal Desportivo Club Albufeira
 Louletano D.C.
 Lusitano FC
 Quarteira S.C.
 Silves F.C.
 S.R. Almancilense

At the end of the season the champions will be promoted to the national third tier. The team placed second gains entry to the Portuguese FA Cup.
The three lowest teams will be relegated to Algarve League Division Two.

Division Two (2ª divisão)

 4 ao Cubo Olhāo
 Carvoeiro United
 C.D. Marítimo Olhanense 
 C.D.R. Quarteirense
 International Club Almancil
 JS Campinense
 Padernense Clube
 Portimenense S.C. B
 S.C. Farense B
 UDR Sambrasense

The winners will be promoted to Division One.

Taça do Algarve
The regional cup competition is competed for by the teams above, plus those in the national third tier.

It is of note that the number of clubs in the Algarve has declined significantly in recent years. Among the casualties are Campinense, Castromarinense, Infante de Sagres, Beira Mar Monte Gordo, Serrano (São Marcos da Serra), Bensafrim. Os Machados and Internacional Almancil.

Former participants
Other clubs that have competed in the Distritais include:

Algarve United Futebol SAD
Associação Académica da Universidade do Algarve
Associação Ases de Alcantarilha
Associação Cultural de Salir
Associação Recreativa Cultural Amorosa
Casa do Povo da Mexilhoeira Grande
Centro de Educação Desportiva de Lagos
Clube de Futebol Montes Alvorense
Clube de Futebol Os Bonjoanenses
Clube Desportivo Boliqueime
Clube Desportivo e Recreativo Santaluziense
Clube Oriental de Pechão
Clube Recreativo Infante de Sagres
Clube Recreativo Praia da Salema
Clube Recreativo Vila do Bispo
Futebol Clube de Bias
Futebol Clube Ferreiras (B)
Futebol Clube Império
Gil Eanes Juventude Portimonense Clube
Grupo Desportivo Beira Mar
Grupo Desportivo Beira Mar (B)
Grupo Desportivo Cultural Salgados
Grupo Desportivo da Atalaia
Grupo Desportivo de Alcoutim
Grupo Desportivo de Burgau
Grupo Desportivo e Cultural Jograis António Aleixo
Grupo Desportivo e Recreativo Alvorense
Grupo Desportivo Odeceixense
Grupo Desportivo Safol Olhanense
Grupo Desportivo Torralta
Guia Futebol Clube (B)
India Futebol Clube Olhanense
Instituto D. Francisco Gomes – Casa dos Rapazes
Internacional Clube de Almancil
Juventude Desportiva Monchiquense (B)
Leões Futebol Clube Tavira
Sociedade Recreativa Boa União Parchalense
Sport Clube de Benafim
Sport Lagos e Benfica
Sport Lisboa e Faro
Sport Lisboa e Fuzeta
Sporting Clube Olhanense (B)
União Desportiva e Recreativa Sambrazense (B)

District championships

Historic champions

Titles

 SC Olhanense - 16
 Lusitano VRSA - 6
 SC Farense - 5
 Portimonense SC - 1

Recent divisional winners

List of member clubs

Footnote
 1-10 games in Portuguese Cup.     *
 11-100 games in Portuguese Cup.  * *
 101+ games in Portuguese Cup.     * * *

References

External links
Associação de Futebol do Algarve Website

Algarve
Sports organizations established in 1922
Sport in Faro, Portugal